Truncospora is a genus of 10 species of fungi in the family Polyporaceae.

Taxonomy
The genus was originally proposed by Czech mycologist Albert Pilát in 1941, but this publication is invalid because a type species was not designated, contrary to the rules of botanical nomenclature. He published the genus validly in 1953 with two species: Truncospora oboensis, and the type, T. ochroleuca. Leif Ryvarden placed the genus in synonymy with Perenniporia in 1972, but molecular studies have shown that Truncospora is distinct genetically, and comprises part of the "core polyporoid clade", a grouping of fungi roughly equivalent to the family Polyporaceae.

The generic name Truncospora is derived from the Latin trunco ("I cut off") and the Ancient Greek  ("spore").

Description
The skeletal hyphae range from non-dextrinoid to dextrinoid, and the spores are truncate and strongly dextrinoid.

Species
, Index Fungorum accepts 10 species of Truncospora:
Truncospora arizonica Spirin & Vlasák (2014) – USA
Truncospora atlantica Spirin & Vlasák (2014) – Macaronesia; Iberian Peninsula
Truncospora detrita (Berk.) Decock (2011) – Africa
Truncospora floridana Vlasák & Spirin (2014) – Caribbean
Truncospora macrospora B.K.Cui & C.L.Zhao (2013) – China
Truncospora mexicana Vlasák, Spirin & Kout (2014) – Mexico
Truncospora oboensis Decock (2011) – São Tomé
Truncospora ornata Spirin & Bukharova (2014) – East Asia
Truncospora tropicalis Vlasák & Spirin (2014) – Caribbean
Truncospora wisconsinensis C.L.Zhao & Pfister (2015) – USA

References

Polyporaceae
Polyporales genera
Taxa described in 1953